Beau Young is an Australian surfer, singer and songwriter.

Early life
Beau was born 28 August 1974 in Grafton, New South Wales, the second youngest of four children of the 1960s and 1970s surfer Nat Young.

Surfing career
Following in his father's footsteps, his success as a professional surfer earned him the highest status in being crowned the ASP World Longboard Champion in 2000 and again in 2003, defeating Joel Tudor on both occasions in the final. In 1998, he finished second in the ASP World Tour. He then retired from competition and pursued a successful music career. His brother, Bryce Young, is also a professional longboarder and his sisters Nava and Naomi are also notable surfers.

Music career
In 2005, Young released his first album, Waves of Change, in Australia and Japan. The album debuted at #13 on the independent charts in Australia, reaching #10 in the following weeks. His second album, One Step at a Time, was released in 2008. He has toured Japan four times, Italy, France, the U.S. and Spain.

Filmography
Hang (2005) (video) .... Himself
Singlefin: Yellow (2005) (video) .... Himself
The Coconut Technique (2004) (video) .... Himself
Cleo Bachelor 2002: Real Men Revealed (2002) (TV) .... Himself
Costa Rica: Land of Waves (2001) (video) .... Himself
The Endless Summer 2 (1994) .... Surfer

References

Australian surfers
World Surf League surfers
Living people
1974 births
Australian singer-songwriters
21st-century Australian singers